Jeff Prosserman (born November 2, 1983) is a Canadian cross-platform producer and director with experience in film, interactive, and mobile content strategy, development, and production. Prior to founding LIVESTAGE°, Prosserman was the Founder of Gusto Goods, a production company based in New York and Toronto.

Prosserman was born in Toronto, Ontario, Canada. He produced, wrote, and directed Chasing Madoff, a 2010 feature documentary on an attempt to expose Bernie Madoff's Ponzi scheme. Chasing Madoff premiered at the International Documentary Film Festival Amsterdam and was distributed across the United States by Cohen Media Group and in Canada by Entertainment One. Prosserman was also the Executive Producer of Monogamy, a feature film that premiered at the Tribeca Film Festival and was released by Oscilloscope Laboratories.

Following the release of these films, Prosserman worked as a content producer to launch The Daily, the first digital publication created by News Corporation for the iPad.

Over the course of his career, Prosserman has produced global interactive advertising campaigns with clients that include IBM, BBC Worldwide, Dell, Reuters, Johnson & Johnson, ThinkFilm, Cynthia Rowley, Centre for Addiction and Mental Health, and many more.

As the Co-Founder and Chief Creative Officer for  LIVESTAGE°, Prosserman is responsible for product development, content, and design, while guiding the creative and brand direction for the company.

Filmography

References

External links 

Living people
1983 births
Film directors from Toronto
Canadian documentary film producers
Canadian documentary film directors
Film producers from Ontario